Lobenzarit (INN) is a drug used in the treatment of arthritis. It is an immunomodulator.

References 

Immunomodulating drugs
Anthranilic acids
Chloroarenes
Drugs with unknown mechanisms of action